Pike Township is one of the fourteen townships of Perry County, Ohio, United States.  The 2000 census found 6,595 people in the township, 1,906 of whom lived in the unincorporated portions of the township.

Geography
Located in the central part of the county, it borders the following townships:
Clayton Township - north
Harrison Township - northeast
Bearfield Township - east
Pleasant Township - southeast
Salt Lick Township - south
Monday Creek Township - southwest corner
Jackson Township - west
Reading Township - northwest corner

The city of New Lexington, the county seat of and only city in Perry County, is located in northern Pike Township, and the unincorporated community of Bristol lies in the township's south.

Name and history
Pike Township was organized around 1814, and named for Zebulon Pike, a United States Army captain. It is one of eight Pike Townships statewide.

Government
The township is governed by a three-member board of trustees, who are elected in November of odd-numbered years to a four-year term beginning on the following January 1. Two are elected in the year after the presidential election and one is elected in the year before it. There is also an elected township fiscal officer, who serves a four-year term beginning on April 1 of the year after the election, which is held in November of the year before the presidential election. Vacancies in the fiscal officership or on the board of trustees are filled by the remaining trustees.

References

External links
County website

Townships in Perry County, Ohio
Townships in Ohio
1814 establishments in Ohio
Populated places established in 1814